Ahmad H. Nasri is the current President of Fahd bin Sultan University.

Professor Nasri was educated at the Lebanese University (BS Mathematics, 1978) and the University of East Anglia (PhD, 1985). He was formerly a Professor at the American University of Beirut.

References

Year of birth missing (living people)
Living people
Lebanese University alumni
Alumni of the University of East Anglia
Academic staff of the American University of Beirut